Sheorajvati Nehru (born 1897) represented Lucknow (Lok Sabha constituency) for Congress from 1953 to 1957 after winning a by-poll. She was a relative of Indian Prime Minister Jawaharlal Nehru. She was a freedom fighter.

References

India MPs 1952–1957
Women in Uttar Pradesh politics
1897 births
Nehru–Gandhi family
1955 deaths
Politicians from Lucknow
Indian National Congress politicians from Uttar Pradesh
Indian independence activists from Uttar Pradesh
Prisoners and detainees of British India
Women Indian independence activists
20th-century Indian women politicians
20th-century Indian politicians
19th-century Indian women
19th-century Indian people
Lok Sabha members from Uttar Pradesh